Pemberton's Headquarters, also known as the Willis-Cowan House, is a historic house museum at 1018 Crawford Street in Vicksburg, Mississippi.  Built in 1836, it served as the headquarters for Confederate General John C. Pemberton during most of the 47-day siege of Vicksburg, and was the site where he decided to surrender the city to Union General Ulysses S. Grant on July 4, 1863.  The house is owned by the National Park Service and is open to the public as part of Vicksburg National Military Park.  The house was declared a National Historic Landmark in 1976.

Description and history
Pemberton's Headquarters is located on the eastern fringe of Vicksburg's downtown area, on the south side of Crawford Street just west of Adams Street.  It is a two-story brick building, set well above the street, from which it is separated by a retaining wall and steep terraced landscaping.  A concrete stair climbs through the terracing to provide access to the front of the property.  The house is a large L-shaped structure, with a brick front section and a rear wood-frame addition.  The front portion of the house was built in stages, with the initial structure of 1836 consisting of a main hall and flanking parlors, with a porch (probably smaller but more architecturally elaborate than the present one) sheltering the entrance.  This was enlarged in brick in about 1850, with the rearmost additions coming around the turn of the 20th century.

The house was probably built by William Bobb, who sold it in 1836 to John Willis, an area plantation owner.  It was under Willis ownership at the outbreak of the American Civil War, and when the war came to Vicksburg, Willis's house, one of the largest in the city, was chosen by Confederate General John C. Pemberton as the headquarters for the city's defense.  It was here that Pemberton and his subordinates planned out their military activities, and it is where they made the decision to surrender on July 3, 1863.

The Willises sold the house in 1886, and in 1890 it was bought by Mary Cowan, the wife of a Confederate veteran who died two years later.  Mrs. Cowan died in 1914, and her estate sold it to the Sisters of Mercy, who operated a convent and school across the street.  The house was used as part of their facilities (and called "St. Anthony's Hall") until 1973, when it was sold into private hands.  In need of significant restoration at that time, it continued to decline until the 1990s, when it was sufficiently restored to operated for several years as a bed and breakfast inn.  That enterprise failed, and it stood vacant until its acquisition by the National Park Service in 2003.

The Park Service was authorized in 2002 to purchase the house, for inclusion as an element of the Vicksburg National Military Park.  Although most of that park's facilities are on the city's outskirts, the house is now used to interpret the experiences of the Confederate leadership, and the conditions in the city during the siege.

See also
List of National Historic Landmarks in Mississippi
National Register of Historic Places listings in Warren County, Mississippi

References

External links

Pemberton's Headquarters - Vicksburg National Military Park

National Historic Landmarks in Mississippi
Houses in Warren County, Mississippi
Houses completed in 1836
Historic house museums in Mississippi
American Civil War museums in Mississippi
Museums in Warren County, Mississippi
Buildings and structures in Vicksburg, Mississippi
National Register of Historic Places in Warren County, Mississippi